Orrin Howe (1786 – February 12, 1848) was an American farmer and politician who was one of the first settlers in Lodi Township, Michigan, and served three terms in the Michigan House of Representatives.

Biography 

Orrin Howe was born in Danbury, Connecticut in 1786. He was a farmer and moved to Chenango County, New York, in 1802. He married Jane Mead, the daughter of a prominent citizen of the area, John Mead. After suffering trouble in business, he decided to move to Michigan Territory and settled in Lodi Township in Washtenaw County. He was one of the first four settlers in Lodi when he purchased his property in 1825. He built a log cabin and went back to New York to collect his family, who joined him the following May.

He was elected a justice of the peace in Lodi in April 1831, and also served as the community's first postmaster from 1827 to 1848. The first township meeting after Lodi was formally organized as a township on March 7, 1834, was held at Howe's house. He was a member of the first state constitutional convention in 1835 and was elected three times to the Michigan House of Representatives as a Democrat. He served as speaker pro tempore in 1835 and 1836.

Howe was Universalist. Howe was a Freemason. Howe and his wife had six children: Betsy, Philander R., Polly Harlow, Sarah, Edwin, and Jane. Betsy died shortly after the family had moved to Lodi; hers was the first death recorded in the township. Howe died on February 12, 1848, and is buried in Lodi Cemetery in Saline.

Notes

References 
 
 
 
 
 

1786 births
1848 deaths
American Freemasons
American justices of the peace
American Universalists
Burials in Michigan
Democratic Party members of the Michigan House of Representatives
Michigan postmasters
People from Chenango County, New York
People from Washtenaw County, Michigan
Politicians from Danbury, Connecticut
Delegates to the 1835 Michigan Constitutional Convention
19th-century American judges
19th-century American politicians